The 1924 Open Championship was the 59th Open Championship, held 26–27 June at Royal Liverpool Golf Club in Hoylake, England. Walter Hagen won the second of his four Open Championships, one stroke ahead of runner-up Ernest Whitcombe. It was the fifth of Hagen's eleven major championships. Two years earlier in 1922, he became the Open's first winner born in the United States.

Qualifying took place on 23–24 June, Monday and Tuesday, with 18 holes at Royal Liverpool and 18 holes at Formby, and the top 80 and ties qualified. J.H. Taylor led the field on 142; Hagen took 83 on the first day at Hoylake and was in some danger of not  but after a 73 at Formby for 156 he made it safely through. The qualifying score was 158 and 86 players  Six-time champion Harry Vardon had 159 and missed by one stroke. Wednesday was an idle day.

In the opening round on Thursday morning, Cyril Tolley, the 1920 British Amateur champion, took the lead with 73, but his 82 in the second round dropped him out of contention. After opening with 77, Whitcombe carded a 70 for 147 for a two-stroke lead over five-time champion J.H. Taylor; Hagen and Macdonald Smith were a stroke back in third  In the two-day format, there was not a cut after 36 holes.

In the third round on Friday morning, Hagen had 74 and Whitcombe 77, and they shared the 54-hole lead at 224. Three strokes back in a tie for third were George Duncan, Frank Ball, and Smith. In the afternoon, Duncan had 81 for 308 while Ball and Smith both finished on 304, which left Hagen and Whitcombe to battle for the title. Whitcombe shot 43 on the front-nine but responded with a 35 on the back to post 302. Hagen also shot 43 on the front but played his trademark brand of golf on the back. He sliced his second shot on the 12th and his approach shot found a bunker on the 13th, but both times recovered with a pitch and a putt. Hagen sank a downhill 6-footer (1.8 m) on the final hole to win on 301, a one-stroke victory margin. Had the putt not dropped, a 36-hole playoff was in order for Saturday.

Smith was three strokes back in a tie for third place, one of twelve times he finished in the top-five of a major championship without a victory. Taylor finished in fifth at the age of 53, thirty years after his first Open title. Gene Sarazen, age 22, played in his first British Open this year and was 41st. He won the championship in 1932 and played in the Open as late as 1976.

Past champions in the field 

Source:

Did not advance past qualifying rounds (Monday & Tuesday):
Harry Vardon (1896, 1898, 1899, 1903, 1911, 1914), 159.

Did not enter:
Jock Hutchison (1921), Jack White (1904),  Harold Hilton (1897).

Round summaries

First round
Thursday, 26 June 1924 (morning)

Source:

Second round
Thursday, 26 June 1924 (afternoon)

Source:

Third round
Friday, 27 June 1924 (morning)

Source:

Final round
Friday, 27 June 1924 (afternoon)

Source:

Amateurs: Tolley (314), Sutton (323), Hassall (328), Hope (328), Robinson (329), Walker (332)

References

External links
Royal Liverpool 1924 (Official site)

The Open Championship
Golf tournaments in England
Sport in the Metropolitan Borough of Wirral
Open Championship
Open Championship
Open Championship